The Hahnenkamm is a mountain in Europe, directly southwest of Kitzbühel in the Kitzbühel Alps of Austria.

The Hahnenkamm (German: rooster's comb) is part of the ski resort of Kitzbühel, and hosts an annual World Cup alpine ski race, the Hahnenkammrennen. The most famous slope on the Hahnenkamm is the classic downhill course, the Streif (streak, or stripe), which is regarded as the most demanding race course on the World Cup circuit.  The course features highly technical, "fall-away" turns (reverse bank), many with limited visibility. It also contains several flat gliding sections, immediately preceded by difficult turns, placing a premium on both technical and gliding skills. The Streif is located on the mountain's northeast face which in January is mostly in the shade, adding the difficulty of flat vision to the already exceptionally demanding run.

Hahnenkamm races 

The Hahnenkammrennen are the annual races, held since 1931 and a fixture of the men's World Cup since its inception in the 1967 season.  The races were originally held in March, and sometimes in early February (1949 & 1951). Beginning in 1953, the races at Kitzbühel have been held in mid to late January, often the week following the Lauberhorn in Wengen, Switzerland, another classic downhill.

Since 1959, the race has been broadcast on Austrian television.

In 2009, as well as in 2008, the total prize money was €550,000.

The Hahnenkamm races are currently held in the following disciplines:
 Super-G on the Streifalm, on Friday
 Downhill on the Streif, on Saturday
 Slalom on the Ganslernhang, on Sunday

Traditionally, the winner of the Hahnenkamm race was determined by the combined results of the downhill and slalom competitions. During the World Cup era, the man most likely to be referred to as Hahnenkammsieger (champion) is the winner of the prestigious downhill race.

The Super-G made its debut at Kitzbühel  in 1995, and returned as a regular event in 2000, scheduled the day before the downhill.

Because of challenging weather conditions in January at the top of the mountain, the downhill course is often not run in its entirety.  In the decade of 2000–09, the Streif full course was run in only four of the ten years (2001, 2002, 2004, & 2009).  Unfortunately, this often eliminates one of the most exciting jumps in ski racing, the Mausefalle (mousetrap), seconds from the top of the course.

Upon landing the racers experience a severe compression immediately followed by a sharp left turn, often negotiated unsuccessfully.

Downhill

Slalom

Vertical Up
In the open Streif VerticalUp event, first held in 2011, participants race the Streif upwards to the start booth of the ski race, with free choice of equipment (cross-country skis, shoes with spikes, etc).

Notes and references

External links 

 Hahnenkamm race  
 KitzSki 

 FIS-ski.com - 2017 Hahnenkamm downhill results
 Skimap.org - Kitzbühel area ski maps

Videos
YouTube video - 1981 race live - 18-Jan-1981
YouTube video - 1981 race - crashes only
YouTube video - Franz Klammer, age 30, wins his 4th Hahnenkamm on full course - 21-Jan-1984
YouTube video - career-ending crash of Todd Brooker, 1983 winner, at top of Zielschuss, Friday training run - 24-Jan-1987
YouTube video - Kristian Ghedina on full course - spread eagles at Zielsprung - 6th place - 24-Jan-2004
YouTube video - Hermann Maier on full course - 9th place - 24-Jan-2004
YouTube video - 2004 race coverage from ORF (Austrian Broadcasting) - 24-Jan-2004
YouTube video - Bode Miller skis onto fence exiting Steilhang, takes 2nd - 19-Jan-2008
YouTube video - crash of Scott Macartney at Zielsprung, takes 33rd - 19-Jan-2008
YouTube video - crash of Daniel Albrecht at Zielsprung - Thursday training run - 22-Jan-2009
YouTube video - Didier Défago wins 2009 Hahnenkamm on full course - 24-Jan-2009
YouTube video - crash of Hans Grugger at Mausefalle - Thursday training run - 20-Jan-2011

Ski areas in Austria
Kitzbühel
Kitzbühel Alps
Mountains of Tyrol (state)
Mountains of the Alps